Aristotelia pachnopis is a moth of the family Gelechiidae. It was described by Edward Meyrick in 1939. It is found in Java, Indonesia.

References

Moths described in 1939
Aristotelia (moth)
Moths of Indonesia